Laurent Salvador Lamothe (born 14 August 1972) is a Haitian businessman, technology entrepreneur, and political figure who has served in the government of Haiti as Foreign Minister since October 2011, then appointed as Prime Minister on 4 May 2012. On 14 December 2014, Lamothe resigned from his position as Prime Minister.

Early life
Son of Dr Louis G. Lamothe (D.Litt. in Spanish Language and Literature), the founder of the Lope de Vega Institute, and  Ghislaine Fortuney Lamothe, an artist. Lamothe was born in Port-au-Prince. He grew up in an academic and artistic, but also athletic, environment. His elder brother, Ruben, served as captain of the Haitian Davis Cup tennis team for some time. A tennis player himself, Laurent Lamothe represented his country at the Davis Cup in 1994 and 1995.

In 2013, Lamothe dated Czech model Petra Němcová, but as of 2015 they are no longer together.

Education 
At age 19, Lamothe left Haiti to complete his tertiary studies in Florida. After obtaining a bachelor's degree in political sciences at Barry University in Miami, in 1996 he enrolled in Saint Thomas University in Miami Gardens, Florida, where he earned a master's degree in business management.

Political career 
In 1998, Lamothe co-founded the telecommunications company Global Voice Group. Today the company a global organisation in Information and Communications Technology (ICT.  GVG earned the 2014 Frost & Sullivan Best Practices Award for its outstanding innovation in the domain of IT solutions designed for governments and regulatory authorities.

Lamothe entered politics by accepting the position of Special Advisor to Haitian President Michel Martelly.

In September 2011, Lamothe and former United States President Bill Clinton co-chaired the Presidential Advisory Council for the Economic Development and Investment in Haiti launched by President Martelly on 8 September 2011 to help redevelop Haiti by making it more attractive to foreign companies and investors.

Later the same year, Lamothe was appointed Minister of Foreign Affairs. On 26 October 2011, he made his maiden speech as the new Minister of Foreign Affairs during his installation ceremony, which took place in Bois-Verna, Haiti.

On 1 March 2012, following the resignation of Prime Minister Garry Conille. Lamothe was designated as the Prime Minister of Haiti. President Martelly favoured Lamothe, as competent and dynamic foreign affairs minister, a talented entrepreneur with the vision to move Haiti forward and therefore a good successor.

During Lamothe's tenure as Prime Minister, foreign direct investment increased to the highest level since the fall of the Duvalier dictatorship in the mid 1980s. Under his leadership, the government pursued reforms that made Haiti a safer and more business-friendly country with the implementation of a 15-year tax break to companies investing in the island nation. He also pushed for an increase of the police force by 30 percent, spearheaded the free education program, and promoted good governance by tackling corruption. During his tenure and according to a 2014 World Bank study, from 2012 to 2014, the number of people in extreme poverty in Haiti dropped from 31% to 24% thanks to the social program EDE PEP, which benefited two million people. 

Lamothe was largely credited for overseeing Haiti’s reconstruction, post the devastating 2010 earthquake. He was instrumental in relocating approximately 1.6 million people from the resulting tent camps, as well as in removing 97% of the rubble that the earthquake caused. Four years after the earthquake, kidnappings had decreased by 55 per cent; public investments had increased by 8 per cent; and there were almost 200 projects dedicated to rebuilding of the community.

On 14 December 2014, Lamothe resigned from his position as Prime Minister. During his 31 months as prime minister foreign investment and school enrollment both increased, crime decreased and most of the encampments that sprung up following the January 2010 earthquake were gone.

In 2015, hoping to succeed his former boss President Martelly, his candidacy for the upcoming presidential campaign was barred. Lawyers for the opposition party CEP declared that Lamothe lacked the required "discharge". A requirement in the Haitian Constitution for government officials who were accountable for public monies, is to undergo an audit which reflects the Haitian state’s assessment that government officials had properly accounted for the use public funds during their tenure in office.  Under the Haitian Constitution, a discharge is a prerequisite for former officials who seek to return to public office. Lamothe was subjected to three audits conducted by the Cour Supérieure des Comptes et du Contentieux Administratif, the authority responsible for controlling public expenditures in Haiti.  All the audit reports cleared Lamothe as having managed the public funds in a manner that was satisfactory to the auditors.

In July 2015, Lamothe created LSL World Initiative, a private enterprise providing solutions to governments in implementing their own funding mechanisms to help them deliver sustainable development programs in line with their needs and priorities.

In December 2015, Lamothe founded the Dr. Louis G Lamothe Foundation (LGLF) in honour and memory of his father Louis G Lamothe. The Foundation will concentrate on the strategies to lead Haiti to emerging country status by 2041. After Hurricane Matthew struck Haiti, the Dr. Louis G. Lamothe Foundation has been working in Anse du Clerc to help the town recover from the damages. The Foundation aims to rehabilitate the fishing village and revive its economic activity by repairing the damaged houses and facilitating the acquisition of fishing equipment, among others. The Foundation also aims to make various seeds for agriculture available to the farmers.

On 20 November 2022, Lamothe was sanctioned by the Canadian Government for his involvement in human rights violations and supporting criminal gangs. Lamothe has denied these allegations, as Ottawa provided no evidence. A press release by the office of Canadian Prime Minister Justin Trudeau mentioned that Lamothe is "suspected of protecting and enabling the illegal activities of armed criminal gangs.

Lamothe issued a statement on 21 November 2022 calling the accusations absurd and that he was shocked to learn about the sanctions through social media. Calling it an "arbitrary decision by the Canadian government", Lamothe ends the statement by demanding a public apology. On 22 December, Lamothe filed a notice of application with Canada's Federal Court, arguing the sanctions were arbitrary decision and did not give Lamothe a chance to offer his side of the story.

Awards and accolades 
Lamothe was named as the Ernst & Young’s "Entrepreneur of the Year" title in May 2008. 

In 2015 National Alliance for the Advancement of Haitian Professionals (NAAHP) Golden Honors Award for his outstanding work, integrity and commitment to Haiti and its Diaspora. He also received the Social Media Person of the Year award in 2015 by the Social Media Association of Haiti.

In March 2016, Lamothe was inducted to the Sunshine State Conference Hall of Fame 2016. In November of the same year he received the ABiCC Award for Leadership in Global Trade 2016 at the forty Bi-National Chambers of Commerce in Florida for his outstanding work as an entrepreneur, assisting the governments of developing countries in the regulation and globalization of their telecommunications and IT sectors, which helped improve these countries’ competitiveness and economic sustainability. This was followed by another award in December, the MEDays Grand Prize of Solidarity with the Haitian people, for his work with the Dr. Louis G. Lamothe Foundation in Haiti.

In 2017, Lamothe was a guest of honor at the Transform Africa Summit, and shared his vision about the "Internet of Value: Blockchain and the Internet of Things". At the 2018 World Economic Forum in Davos, Lamothe also spoke about Blockchain and how the technology can enhance government continuity and resilience. 

Lamothe has been invited to participate as a speaker in the Berlin Economic Forum to be held in the German capital on 6–11 March 2018.

In 2019 Lamothe participated as a panelist at Angotic Angola's most recognized innovation forum. He also joined the United Nations Climate Action Summit as a guest speaker at the Smart Climate Day event hosted by the Monaco Better World Forum. Lamothe was inducted into the ‘Power Brand LIFE: Hall of Fame 2019’, for his outstanding achievements in the struggle for equality and human rights in Haiti through his work with his Foundation.

In 2021 a new book  "The Hands of the Prime Minister" by renowned photojournalist Philip Holsinger was released. It is the "Untold Story of a Haitian Entrepreneur Who Accidentally Became Prime Minister, Then Helped Rebuild the Country in 932 Days."

References

External links

|-

Prime Ministers of Haiti
Foreign Ministers of Haiti
1972 births
Living people
Haitian businesspeople
Barry University alumni
St. Thomas University (Florida) alumni
Haitian people of Mulatto descent
21st-century Haitian politicians
People named in the Pandora Papers